The 2018–19 Temple Owls women's basketball team will represent Temple University during the 2018–19 NCAA Division I women's basketball season. The season marks the sixth for the Owls as members of the American Athletic Conference. The Owls, led by eleventh year head coach Tonya Cardoza, play their home games at McGonigle Hall and the Liacouras Center. They finished the season 11–19, 7–9 in AAC play to finish a tie for fifth place. They lost in the first of the American Athletic Conference women's tournament to Memphis.

Media
All Owls home games will have video streaming on Owls TV, ESPN3, or AAC Digital. Road games will typically be streamed on the opponent's website, though conference road games could also appear on ESPN3 or AAC Digital. There are no radio broadcasts for Owls women's basketball games.

Roster

Schedule and results

|-
! colspan=12 style=| Exhibition

|-
! colspan=12 style=| Regular season

|-
! colspan=12 style=| AAC Women's Tournament

Rankings

See also
 2018–19 Temple Owls men's basketball team

References

Temple Owls women's basketball seasons
Temple
Temple
Temple